George Donald (February 13, 1885 – August 12, 1931) was an American Negro league shortstop between 1907 and 1910.

A native of Due West, South Carolina, Donald attended Morris Brown College. He made his Negro leagues debut in 1907 with the Birmingham Giants, and played for Birmingham again the following season. Donald went on to play for the San Antonio Black Bronchos and Oklahoma Monarchs through 1910. He died in Wagoner County, Oklahoma in 1931 at age 46.

References

External links
Baseball statistics and player information from Baseball-Reference Black Baseball Stats and Seamheads

1885 births
1931 deaths
Birmingham Giants players
Oklahoma Monarchs players
San Antonio Black Bronchos players